Come In and Burn is the fifth full-length studio album by the Rollins Band. Released in 1997 on DreamWorks SKG, it is their major label debut. It is also the last album before vocalist Henry Rollins dissolved the band's "classic" lineup of guitarist Chris Haskett, bassist Melvin Gibbs, drummer Sim Cain and sound technician Theo Van Rock. Rollins later formed a new version of Rollins Band with musicians from Mother Superior, who provided his backing band from 1998 until 2006, when the classic Rollins Band lineup briefly reunited.

Recording and music
The lead up to the making of the album was marred by a legal dispute between Henry Rollins and Imago Records, the label that had released the two prior Rollins Band albums. Rollins went on to sign with the newly created label DreamWorks Records.

Come In and Burn was the first and only Rollins Band album to be produced by Steve Thompson. The band and Thompson recorded around 19 to 22 songs, with pre-production occurring in New York City, and the recording itself taking place in Bearsville, New York. Chris Haskett later reflected, "in terms of sound quality, and the way the instruments sound on it – it’s the best record we made. But with that said, I also think the songs are overwritten. There was too much thinking. When we were working on it, we were in between labels. There was a big legal dispute between our old label and our new label. So we couldn’t record, we couldn’t do anything except go to the rehearsal room five days a week and work on music." At the time, Rollins said, "basically, I don't have a life. I don’t have any drug addictions to slow me down. I don’t have any dependency on alcohol and I don’t have a girlfriend or wife or children. The only thing that interests me is work." In a March 1997 interview, he added. "this stuff we worked like into the dirt, we wrote over thirty songs. We just went over these things with a fine tooth come. To the point where we had to walk away from it. That's when we brought in the producer. Because we didn't even know if we had a record or not at this point."  Henry Rollins' early working titles for the album were Claim Your Baggage and Baggage Claim, a reference to the overall lyrical content.

In a 1997 interview with Melody Maker, Rollins reflected, "for me, the real hard thing with this album was lyrically. There's a lot of areas where I don't go to; feelings I have and know very well. I can articulate them but I don't know if I really have the courage to go wear them on my sleeve every night. So, this time around, if there's one concept, it's change. Don't do the same damn thing you always do. You're now thirtysomething, you know tons about music, so take your music somewhere. That's why a song like 'All I Want' came about, where it's way more vulnerable."

In another 1997 interview with Metal Hammer, Rollins explained the lyrical content of the track "Shame", saying it "deals with things that have happened to me that I can't face and can't really talk about, and they've had a big impact on my life. Everyone has things they've said or done or been that they're ashamed of, I don't think anyone gets out clean. There's a lot of confusion and a lot of hurt in the rear-view mirror. Some of it, I've been able to face and some of it, I'm working towards. It's a process. But I know there are some things that eat me up and hurt, so I decided to write a song about it." He further added that "During a City" was inspired by his time in New York City during the making of the album. All the other members of the band were based in New York, whereas Rollins was based in Los Angeles. The song "Saying Goodbye Again" is about the irrationality of people dying prematurely due to drug abuse, with the last verse referring to a deceased friend of Rollins who was a drummer for Los Angeles band Stains. According to Haskett, the song "Starve" was producer Steve Thompson's idea, and was intentionally less complex in arrangement than other songs on the album, recalling that Thompson said to "go play a hardcore song on dropped D". Haskett included "Neon" as among his ten favorite Rollins Band songs in a 2015 Louder Sound article, saying "'Neon' is up there with 'Burned Beyond Recognition' and 'Disconnect' as one of my favourites to play. It’s one of the better mixes of words and music we were writing."

Touring and promotion
The Come In and Burn tour lasted from April 1997 to October 1997, covering North America, Europe, Australia and Japan. That year, the band also made appearances on Later... with Jools Holland and Saturday Night Live, where they were introduced by guest host Pamela Anderson. Metal Injection ranked their Later... with Jools Holland performance of "On My Way to the Cage" as one of the "10 Greatest Metal Performances on British Television". Metal Insider included them and their Saturday Night Live performance of "Starve" on a list of the "Heaviest SNL Musical Guests". To further support the album, music videos were made for lead single "Starve" and "The End of Something". The "Starve" video, directed by Modi Frank, includes footage from the recording sessions, as well as live footage.

Following the tour, the lineup dissolved. In a September 1998 CMJ interview, Rollins said that the band were on indefinite hiatus, citing the lukewarm response to the Come In and Burn tour and the album itself. Earlier in 1998 Rollins had formed a band with a lineup featuring members of Mother Superior, performing a few low key concerts in the United States during that year. Rollins did not originally intend to use the Rollins Band moniker for this project, but his management insisted he do so. Chris Haskett remembered, "at the end of 1997 we were really burnt out. I figured we would be on a break and then reconvene once everybody had cooled off and had a rest. But then in 1998 I started getting emails from fans telling me how excited they were that RB was coming to Chicago and a few other places. I knew Henry was doing stuff with Mother Superior but I thought that would just be a side project so there you go. So I found out I wasn't in the band via the internet." Haskett subsequently moved to Australia following his departure from Rollins Band.

Release and reception

Come In and Burn failed to replicate the commercial success of 1994's Weight, and as of 1999, had sold 96,000 units in the United States. Weight by comparison had sold 423,000 units as of 1996. Reviewing for The Village Voice in December 1997, Robert Christgau said "this thrash-and-churn is [Rollins'] metalest metal ever", but regarded its lyrical content as "melodrama" concocted from "an adolescent despair [remembered] via groupies and fan mail". Bill Meredith of AllMusic commented that "not everyone agreed with [Rollins] decision to break up his band after the experimental 1997 Come in and Burn CD" and described the music as a mixture of "rock and funk, jazz/fusion, and metal". Stephen Thompson of The A.V. Club mentioned that the album contained a "surprisingly bottom-heavy mix [and] chunky guitars." Rolling Stone in 1997 compared it to the Helmet album Aftertaste, which was released a week earlier, and which would also turn out to be the last album with most of their original lineup. The review remarks, "Helmet's Aftertaste and the Rollins Band's Come In and Burn are prime examples of the '90s brand of paramilitary headbanging. With their drillsergeant demeanors and drill-press riffs, the Rollins Band and Helmet typify this Spartan approach to hard rock."
Canadian magazine RPM wrote in their review that Rollins is, "incredibly intelligent and highly articulate – something that comes through in songs like 'Inhale Exhale', 'Rejection', 'Shame' and 'On My Way to the Cage'", while music site Brainwashed observed that, "bass player Melvin Gibbs was the new guy for Weight, but now he's an integral part of the band. The rhythm section really shines thanks to the open arrangements on many of the songs." Tom Sinclair of Entertainment Weekly stated that Gibbs, Haskett and Cain had "perfected a truly massive two-parts-metal/one-part-fusion musical onslaught". However, he was more critical of Rollins, remarking "Come In and Burn finds him again melodramatically declaiming lyrics that sound like transcriptions from a therapy session, over his band’s patented, jazz-tinged Uberrock. Burn begins with 'Shame', ends with 'Rejection', and in between covers anomie, loneliness, dysfunction, and low self-esteem." Sinclair added, "at the close of 'Thursday Afternoon', a woman’s voice is heard saying, 'When I’m around animals or children, my problems don’t seem as intense.' A session with Burn may prove more effective than either kittens or kids for putting one's worries in perspective." James P. Wisdom of Pitchfork gave it only a 3.5 out of 10. He pondered, "what happened after The End of Silence that fucked up Rollins' music? To follow such a powerful album with this terrible record is criminal."

Legacy
In May 2000, news publication New Times Broward-Palm Beach labelled the album "underrated", and claimed that the follow-up Get Some Go Again did not have the same "rebellious gusto". On Come In and Burns 20th anniversary in 2017, Diffuser.fm wrote that "from the opening swirl of 'Shame,' the music is tighter, darker and more atmospheric than its predecessors." Regarding the album's lack of success, Haskett said, "'The End of Something', it doesn’t grab you. There was no single. There was nothing to hook people with. Even after the record was finished Melvin and I said something like 'Let us go away and write something very quick!'. And we did try but it got no traction. So the record came out with nothing for people to grab onto. It’s still a great record [but] It was a harder thing to tour on [and] it was a harder thing to get people’s attention with." He also said, "the songs are too complex... I mean, they’re great, compositionally they’re amazing. But Henry’s strength comes from kind of clean simplicity. If you make the background behind his vocals too complex, it kind of dilutes the power of his voice."

 Track listing 
 "Shame" – 5:32
 "Starve" – 4:08
 "All I Want" – 4:41
 "The End of Something" – 4:50
 "On My Way to the Cage" – 3:20
 "Thursday Afternoon" – 4:04
 "During a City" – 3:39
 "Neon" – 4:28
 "Spilling Over the Side" – 3:44
 "Inhale Exhale" – 3:39
 "Saying Goodbye Again" – 3:34
 "Rejection" – 4:37
 "Rollins Band Interactive" (1997 enhanced CD bonus)
 "Disappearing Act" (European and Japanese edition bonus track) – 3:40
 "Also Ran" (Japanese edition bonus track) – 3:42

 Come In and Burn Sessions reissue (2005) 
CD 1:
 "Shame"
 "Starve"
 "All I Want"
 "The End of Something"
 "On My Way to the Cage"
 "Thursday Afternoon"
 "Also Ran"
 "During a City"
 "Neon"
 "Threshold"
 "Spilling Over the Side"
CD 2:
 "Inhale Exhale"
 "Saying Goodbye Again"
 "Rejection"
 "Disappearing Act"
 "Stray"
 "Unknown Hero"
 "During a City (alt.)"
 "Destroying the World"
 "E.O.S." (Grooverider remix)
 "E.O.S." (We Change Fear remix)

 Personnel Rollins Band Henry Rollins – vocals
 Sim Cain  – drums
 Melvin Gibbs  – bass
 Chris Haskett  – guitarTechnical'
 Theo Van Rock  – Rök Juicer, Low End Ranger
 Steve Thompson – producer
 Clif Norrell – engineer, mixing

Charts

References 

Rollins Band albums
1997 albums
2.13.61 albums
DreamWorks Records albums